is a Japanese model, actor, and voice actor.

Filmography

TV series

Films

Video games

References

External links
 Official profile at G-Star.Pro 

Japanese male models
21st-century Japanese male actors
1979 births
Living people
Models from Nagasaki Prefecture
Japanese male film actors
Japanese male television actors
Actors from Nagasaki Prefecture
Fukuoka Institute of Technology alumni